Carnein Glacier is a glacier draining the southeast corner of the Eisenhower Range, flowing south along the west side of McCarthy Ridge to merge with the lower Reeves Glacier at the Nansen Ice Sheet, in Victoria Land. It was mapped by the United States Geological Survey from surveys and from U.S. Navy air photos, 1955–63, and named by the Advisory Committee on Antarctic Names for Carl R. Carnein, glaciologist at McMurdo Station, summer 1965–66.

References
 

Glaciers of Victoria Land
Scott Coast